Butler was a semi-pro American basketball team based in Butler, Pennsylvania that was a member of the Central Basketball League. Butler played just one season (1906−1907) before dropping out of the league.

Year-by-year

References

Basketball teams in Pennsylvania